Steve Wariner is an American country music singer, songwriter and guitarist. His discography comprises nineteen studio albums, six compilation albums, and fifty-five singles. Of his studio albums, three are certified gold by the Recording Industry Association of America (RIAA) for shipments of 500,000 copies each: 1991's I Am Ready, and Burnin' the Roadhouse Down and Two Teardrops from 1998 and 1999 respectively. I Am Ready was Wariner's first release for Arista Nashville following tenures on RCA and MCA Nashville, and Burnin' the Roadhouse Down his first for Capitol Records.

Out of his fifty-five solo singles, Wariner has reached Number One on the Billboard country charts nine times. His first was "All Roads Lead to You" in 1981, followed by two streaks of three consecutive Number Ones each: "Some Fools Never Learn," "You Can Dream of Me" and "Life's Highway" between 1985 and 1986, and "Small Town Girl," "The Weekend" and "Lynda" between 1986 and 1987, followed by "Where Did I Go Wrong" and "I Got Dreams," both in 1989.

Wariner has also been featured as a guest performer on singles by Nicolette Larson, Glen Campbell, Mark O'Connor, Anita Cochran and Clint Black, and has featured Garth Brooks as a guest vocalist on two of his own singles. Wariner's guest appearance on Cochran's late 1997-early 1998 hit "What If I Said" became Wariner's tenth Number One hit, as well as his first Billboard Hot 100 hit at number 59. Although he never had any Number One country hits after this song, his singles "Two Teardrops" and "I'm Already Taken" (the latter a re-recording of his 1978 debut single, which peaked at 63 that year) reached 30 and 42 on the pop charts while also reaching Top 5 at country. Wariner's last Top Ten country hit was his guest vocal on Black's 2000 single release "Been There," a number 5 country and number 44 pop hit.

Besides his single releases and guest appearances, Wariner collaborated with Lee Roy Parnell and Diamond Rio on a rendition of "Workin' Man Blues" which reached 48 on the country charts credited to Jed Zeppelin. He has also charted with a cover version of "Get Back" from the 1995 Beatles tribute album Come Together: America Salutes The Beatles, and one Christmas release from the multi-artist Capitol Records album Shimmy Down the Chimney.

Studio albums

1980s

1990s

2000s

2010s and 2020s

Compilation albums

Singles

1970s and 1980s

1990s and 2000s

As a featured artist

Christmas singles

Promotional singles

Charted B-sides

Music videos

Guest appearances

Notes

References

Discographies of American artists
Country music discographies